Steffi Frühwirt (born 22 July 1980) is a German ice hockey player. She competed in the women's tournaments at the 2002 Winter Olympics and the 2006 Winter Olympics.

References

External links
 

1980 births
Living people
German women's ice hockey players
Olympic ice hockey players of Germany
Ice hockey players at the 2002 Winter Olympics
Ice hockey players at the 2006 Winter Olympics
People from Wolfratshausen
Sportspeople from Upper Bavaria
21st-century German women